Joseph Wolfe is an English conductor, the son of London Symphony Orchestra conductor, the late Sir Colin Davis, and Lady Davis (the late Ashraf Naini).

References

External links
 Robert Gilder & Co. - Joseph Wolfe biography

English conductors (music)
British male conductors (music)
Living people
21st-century British conductors (music)
21st-century British male musicians
Year of birth missing (living people)